María Pía Shaw is an Argentine journalist.

Awards and nominations
 2013 Martín Fierro Awards, nomination for Best News Reporter

References

Argentine journalists
Living people
Year of birth missing (living people)